Megachile atrocastanea is a species of bee in the family Megachilidae. It was described by Alfken in 1932.

References

Atrocastanea
Insects described in 1932